Coleophora laurentella is a moth of the family Coleophoridae. It is found in North America, including Maine, New Brunswick and Nova Scotia.

The larvae feed on the leaves of genus Aster sensu lato (broadly), including Symphyotrichum novi-belgii. They create an annulate case.

References

laurentella
Moths described in 1944
Moths of North America